Abraham and Lot's conflict (Merivat Roey Avraham Ve'Roey Lot) is an event in the Book of Genesis, in the weekly Torah portion, Lech-Lecha, that depicts the separation of Abraham and Lot, as a result of a fight among their shepherds. The dispute ends in a peaceful way, in which Abraham concedes a part of the Promised Land, which belongs to him, in order to resolve the conflict peacefully.

Biblical narrative
 
In Genesis 13:5-13, Abraham (then called Abram) and Lot separate, as a result of the quarrel among the shepherds. At the beginning of the story, Lot is described as a very wealthy man, like Abraham is after his return from Egypt. The biblical text does not elaborate on the exact reason for the dispute, however, as a result of this, Abraham offers Lot to separate, in order to prevent the fight, and he grants Lot with the right to be the first among the two to pick the territory he desires:

Robert Alter suggests that Abraham's language is "clear, firm and polite." Lot accepts the peace deal, for the Partition of the Land, and chooses the area of the plain of the Jordan – in the area including Sodom, and the story ends with Abraham and Lot separately settling in different areas of the Land:

Outcome
The reference to Sodom in verse 13 suggests that Lot made a bad choice. The narrator uses Lot's choice of land near Sodom as a way of foreshadowing Lot's role in the Battle of Siddim, in which Lot is taken captive in battle, and the role of Lot in the destruction of Sodom and Gomorrah. Lot pitches his tents near Sodom according to Genesis 13:12. By 14:12, Lot is living in the city itself. The destruction of Sodom is related in chapter 19.

References

Abraham
Lot (biblical person)
Lech-Lecha